Yvan Chasle (November 13, 1932 – August 15, 1987) was a Canadian professional hockey player who played 591 games in the Eastern Hockey League with the New Haven Blades.

References

External links
 

1987 deaths
1932 births
Sportspeople from Salaberry-de-Valleyfield
New Haven Blades players
Canadian ice hockey left wingers